Roland Francis "Ron" Broom (7 February 1925 – 24 December 2016) was a New Zealand first-class cricketer who played for Wellington.

Born in Te Kuiti on 7 February 1925, Broom was a left-arm medium-pace bowler and left-hand batsman. He made three first-class appearances for Wellington in the 1954/55 season, taking six wickets at an average of 19.00. With the bat he scored 47 runs, with a high score of 21, at an average of 11.75.

Broom died in Palmerston North on 24 December 2016, and he was buried in Kelvin Grove Cemetery.

References

1925 births
2016 deaths
Sportspeople from Te Kūiti
New Zealand cricketers
Wellington cricketers
Burials at Kelvin Grove Cemetery
Cricketers from Waikato